is a Japanese voice actress from Tokyo, Japan. She was married since April 2014 and that she has given birth to a boy on January 1, 2016.

Filmography

Television animation
 Angel Tales (TV) as Hamster no Kurumi
 Rozen Maiden (TV) as Mrs. Rabbit (ep 3)
 Tenshi no Shippo Chu! (TV) as Hamster Kurumi
 The Idolmaster as Yayoi Takatsuki
 Puchimas! Petit Idolmaster as Yayoi Takatsuki and Yayo
 Dragon Crisis! as Misaki Etō

Video games
 The Idolmaster series as Yayoi Takatsuki
 Mugen Souls Z as Reu
 Rainbow Islands: Putty's Party as Putty
 Arcana Heart series as Lilica Felchenerow

References

External links
 Official agency profile 
 
 

1979 births
Living people
I'm Enterprise voice actors
Japanese video game actresses
Japanese voice actresses
Voice actresses from Tokyo